The 2018 season is Bhayangkara's 2nd season in Liga 1 since change their name from Bhayangkara Surabaya United.

On April 12, 2016, Surabaya United merged with the team following the Bhayangkara Cup 2016, PS Polri, and changed its name to Bhayangkara Surabaya United F.C. until September 2016.
And in September 2016, their moved home to Bekasi, and change their name to Bhayangkara F.C. Bhayangkara F.C. manage to win the 2017 Liga 1 under coach Simon McMenemy.

Players

Current squad

Out on loan

Transfer

In
1st leg

2nd leg

Out
1st leg

2nd leg

Loans in
2nd leg

Loans out
2nd leg

Competitions

Liga 1

Piala Indonesia

Squad statistics

Appearances
As of 22 September 2018

|-
|colspan="14"|Players away from the club on loan:

|-
|colspan="14"|Players who appeared for Bhayangkara no longer at the club:

|}

References

Indonesian football clubs 2018 season
Bhayangkara F.C. seasons